Mark Jensen (12 October 1960 – 1 February 2021) was a Canadian luger. He competed in the men's singles event at the 1980 Winter Olympics.

References

External links
 

1960 births
2021 deaths
Canadian male lugers
Olympic lugers of Canada
Lugers at the 1980 Winter Olympics
Sportspeople from Toronto